M. Jairam (born 18 September 1937) is an Indian former cricketer. He played first-class cricket for Andhra and Hyderabad between 1954 and 1971. Playing for Hyderabad, he took the most wickets in the 1964–65 Ranji Trophy, with 34 dismissals in the tournament.

See also
 List of Hyderabad cricketers

References

External links
 

1937 births
Living people
Indian cricketers
Andhra cricketers
Hyderabad cricketers
Cricketers from Chennai